Louis J. Stathis (September 29, 1952 – May 4, 1997) was an American author, critic and editor, mainly in the areas of fantasy and science fiction. During the last four years of his life he was an editor for DC Comics' Vertigo line, working on such titles as Preacher, Doom Patrol, Industrial Gothic, Peter Kuper's The System, and Dhampire.

Work
Stathis was a columnist and editor for Heavy Metal and a columnist for Ted White's Fantastic magazine; during the late 1970s and early 1980s, he also wrote a monthly column on contemporary popular music for Gallery magazine. He worked as an editor for Ace Books, High Times and Reflex magazine.

Stathis collaborated with cartoonist Matt Howarth, co-writing the first few issues of Those Annoying Post Bros., published by Vortex Comics in 1985. In 1989, Stathis wrote The Venus Interface (originally advertised as Interzone: The Wild & Curious Times of Sheldon Zone), a Heavy Metal graphic novel with a cover by Olivia De Berardinis and interior art by Jim Fletcher, Rick Geary, Peter Kuper, Mark Pacella, Kenneth Smith, Arthur Suydam and Michael Uman.

In writing and editing, Stathis took a prismatic approach, noting popular culture linkages:

While he was an editor at Vertigo, Stathis began having headaches that kept him from working. He died of respiratory failure ten months after being diagnosed with a brain tumor.

Awards
In June 1997, he received a special award from the International Horror Guild.

See also
 List of notable brain tumor patients

References

External links
 Business Wire: "Obituary: Lou Stathis"
 Heavy Metal: Lou Stathis interviews David Lynch (full text)
 "Remembering Lou Stathis" by Patty Jeres
 Who's Who of American Comic Books: Lou Stathis

1952 births
1997 deaths
American magazine editors
American comics writers
American music critics
Science fiction editors
20th-century American non-fiction writers